WRKF (89.3 FM) is a U.S. public radio station offering a 24-hour mix of local and national news, information and entertainment programming. WRKF, Baton Rouge's sole NPR affiliate, is owned and operated by Public Radio, Inc. and broadcasts at 28,000 watts.

History
WRKF was launched on January 18, 1980.  Initial programming was typical for a community-based public radio station of that time.  It included classical, jazz, folk, big-band standards, and NPR news.  Studios were in a temporary building at the transmitter site on Frenchtown Road.  In 1986, the station moved to a location on Valley Creek Drive in the city.  The president/general manager is Paul Maassen.

External links
WRKF official website

Radio stations in Louisiana
Radio stations established in 1980
NPR member stations